Sex Appeal, or variants, may refer to:

 Sex appeal, or sexual attraction

Music 
 S.E.X. Appeal, a German trance music project
 Sex Appeal (album), by Georgio, 1987
 "Sex Appeal", a song by Frankie DeCarlos from the 2011 album Empire (Frankie DeCarlos album)
 "Sex Appeal", a song by Ray Cash from the 2006 album Cash on Delivery
 "Sex Appeal", a 1937 song by Eugeniusz Bodo

Film and television 
 Sex Appeal (2022 film), an American teen comedy film
 (Sex) Appeal, a 2014 Taiwanese-Chinese youth romance drama film
 Sex Appeal (TV series), a 1993 television broadcast, available on Globoplay

Other uses 
 Sexappeal, born Anthony Rodríguez, a Dominican dancer
 Sex Appeal (horse), dam of El Gran Senor (1981–2006)

See also 
 
 Sax Appeal
 Six Appeal
 Sox Appeal